The Norwegian-British Chamber of Commerce (NBCC) is a non-profit organisation for the Norwegian-British business community in the UK. It has a membership of more than 100 Norwegian and British companies, as well as a large number of personal members.

The NBCC was founded in 1906 and represents companies and individuals from Norway, the UK and other countries, who wish to be part of the business community. Its mission is to promote trade and investment between Norway and the UK, and to provide a professional and social arena for members and business people. The NBCC works closely with government bodies and other trade organisations, including the Norwegian Embassy, Innovation Norway and other bilateral Chambers of Commerce.

Foundation 
After the dissolution of the union between Norway and Sweden in 1905, Norwegians felt a need to unite. Norwegian business people outside the country felt the need to create cooperative organisations which could support them in their work. Two months after Haakon VII ascended the throne of Norway in November 1905, Norwegian businessmen proposed the creation of a Norwegian Chamber of Commerce in London. Johan Jørgensen was the primary advocate and Norway's consul general; Jørgensen and his business partner, William Johnson, were among the few Norwegians engaged in trade in London with most of the rest representing Norwegian shipping interests.

Jørgensen invited fellow Norwegians to form a Chamber of Commerce in January 1906, and the founding meeting was held in London the following April. 21 Norwegians attended, and Thode Fagelund was named the first president of the NBCC.

Timeline

Bibliography

References

External links
 

1906 establishments in the United Kingdom